Gangare  is a ward in Bikita District of Masvingo Province in south-eastern Zimbabwe. Its name is derived from a large nearby mountain in that area. Mudyiwa is the Councillor ZANU PF as well as the chief of that area.

Cultural background 
Gangare is known for its richness in cultural practices that guarantees ubuntuism and unity. Gangare as small a community consists of the Karanga people, although they share different totems.

Traditionally, Gangare shares part of jurisdiction between  Chief Mazungunye and Mukanganwi.Currently, Nyange or Gomba is the Headman of the area. Traditional chiefs are custodians of culture, hence they are responsible for  strengthening culture, good ethics, education and environmental protection through spearheading best cultural practices for the community to live in peace and  harmony. Traditional dance like Ngororombe are dominant in the community.The Gangare Ngororombe Traditional dance is popular and has been widely valued as an entertainment tool at various gatherings of great importance such as Independence Day, Field Day, ritual ceremonies, marriage ceremonies and traditional beer gatherings.Ngororombe as a traditional dance is also taught in schools.

Education and development
Gangare has a high literacy rate as compared to other communities in Bikita district. It has a high school called Chisungo. In terms of education, Chisungo has produced a significant number of students enrolled in tertiary institutions like UZ, MSU, GZU, and NUST.

Development roadmap

Recent developments are also witnessed in terms of rural electrification.Access to electricity in rural areas is key for development as this will go in line with modern development in technology, information, education, health and economic development.Gangare Clinic, as well as Gangare Primary and Chisungo High  School had been recently electrified so that students will catch up with recent technologies.

The state of the art Gangare clinic pretends to be a relief to nearby communities who in the previous years had to walk several kilometres to access health facilities at Chikuku and Muvhuti clinics, more than 10 kilometers.Pregnant mothers were the mostly affected.

Food security
The community is under threat from food insecurity mainly attributed to climate change. Since 2000, the area has suffered many consequences of severe drought, but that of 2015-2016 (El Nino-induced) was the worst. The drought caused a loss of livestock for many households. Some rural livelihoods, such as small-scale gardening and fishing, have been undermined due to the drying up of rivers and important water sources like Gute in Mudyiwa Village. Victims of the droughts received relief aid from intergovernmental organizations like Care and Plan International.

Bikita District